Italy Has Awakened (Italian:L'Italia s'è desta) is a 1927 Italian silent film directed by Elvira Notari and starring Eduardo Notari. The title refers to the Italian national anthem "Il Canto degli Italiani".

Cast
 Clara Boni 
 Eduardo Notari 
 E. Pensa 
 Gennaro Santoro 
 Oreste Tesorone

References

Bibliography
 Annette Kuhn. The Women's Companion to International Film. University of California Press, 1990.

External links 
 

1927 films
Italian silent feature films
1920s Italian-language films
Films directed by Elvira Notari
Italian black-and-white films